Jeffery Austin McClelland, Jr. (born April 15, 1991), better known by his stage name Jeffery Austin, is an American pop musician and was a contestant on the ninth season of The Voice, turning a single chair and defaulting to be a member of Gwen Stefani's team. He eventually finished in fourth place, behind Jordan Smith, Emily Ann Roberts, and Barrett Baber. His compilation album, The Voice: The Complete Season 9 Collection, placed on the Billboard magazine charts.

Early life
Austin was born Jeffery Austin McClelland, Jr., in St. Charles, Illinois, on April 15, 1991, to Jeffery Sr., and Michele Renee McClelland (née, Brommel), where he was raised with a younger brother, Casey. His parents were married in Austin, Texas on April 25, 1987, and they were married for 13 years before his father's death on July 18, 2000 in New Orleans, Louisiana, when Austin was nine years old. He was a member of the Haines Middle School choir before going on to graduate from St. Charles North High School in 2009. When he was 16, Austin came out as gay to the support of his family. Austin would later graduate from Loyola University Chicago with a Bachelor's degree in 2013, majoring in public relations and advertising. He would then relocate to New York City, where he took a position in the field of public relations, before auditioning for The Voice and moving to Los Angeles.

Music career

The Voice
Austin appeared on  season nine of NBC's The Voice, in the fall of 2015. His audition turned the chair of Gwen Stefani, earning him a spot on her team. Austin eventually finished the competition in fourth place, behind Jordan Smith, Emily Ann Roberts, and Barrett Baber. His compilation album, The Voice: The Complete Season 9 Collection, placed on the Billboard magazine charts, where it peaked at No. 106 on The Billboard 200.

 – Studio version of performance reached the top 10 on iTunes

2016: New music

Discography

Albums

References

External links
 Official website
 Jeffery Austin The Voice artist profile

1991 births
Living people
Republic Records artists
Musicians from Chicago
Songwriters from Illinois
People from Chicago
LGBT people from Illinois
American gay musicians
The Voice (franchise) contestants
20th-century American LGBT people
21st-century American LGBT people